Cheryomushkino is a rural locality (a selo) and the administrative center of Cheryomushkinskoye Selsoviet, Zalesovsky District, Altai Krai, Russia. The population was 1,060 as of 2013. There are 9 streets.

Geography 
Cheryomushkino is located 34 km west of Zalesovo (the district's administrative centre) by road. Maly Kaltay is the nearest rural locality.

References 

Rural localities in Zalesovsky District